Gracie's Apizza is a pizzeria in Portland, Oregon's St. Johns neighborhood, in the United States.

Description
Gracie's Apizza is a pizzeria in North Portland's St. Johns neighborhood. Pizzas use Cairnspring Mills flour from Washington. The restaurant also serves house-made ice cream.

History
Owner Craig Melillo established Gracie's Apizza as a food cart in 2018. The brick and mortar restaurant opened in late 2019, in a space previously occupied by 24th and Meatballs. A relocation was announced in 2022.

Reception
The Oregonian Michael Russell included Gracie's Apizza in a 2018 list of the Portland's best new food carts and a 2020 list of the city's best new pizzerias. He also said in 2018 the restaurant served Portland's best calzone. Gracie's Apizza was nominated for Food Cart of the Year in Eater Portland 2018 Eater Awards. In 2021, the website's Brooke Jackson-Glidden described the restaurant as "perpetually underrated". She and Alex Frane included Gracie's Apizza in a 2021 list of 17 "vital" food carts and restaurants in St. Johns.

See also

 Pizza in Portland, Oregon

References

External links

 

2018 establishments in Oregon
Food carts in Portland, Oregon
Pizzerias in Portland, Oregon
Restaurants established in 2018
St. Johns, Portland, Oregon